Stathis N. Kalyvas (born 7 March, 1964) is a Greek political scientist who is the Gladstone Professor of Government, at the University of Oxford and a University Academic Fellow at All Souls College, Oxford. He has held professorial positions at Yale University (from 2003 to 2017), as well as the University of Chicago, New York University, and Ohio State University. He has also conducted research at the Peace Research Institute Oslo. Kalyvas has written extensively on civil wars, ethnicity, and political violence. He wrote The Logic of Violence in Civil War.

Bibliography
 Modern Greece: What everyone needs to know. New York: Oxford University Press, 2015

 Order, Conflict, Violence. New York: Cambridge University Press, 2008 (edited with Ian Shapiro and Tarek Massoud)

 The Logic of Violence in Civil War. New York: Cambridge University Press, 2006

 The Rise of Christian Democracy in Europe. Ithaca: Cornell University Press, 2006

In Greek

Που είμαστε και που πάμε; Διατρέχοντας την κρίση (2009-2016) και ατενίζοντας το μέλλον [Where Are We and Where Are We Going? The Crisis (2009-2016) and the Future. Athens: Metechmio, 2016]

Εμφύλια πάθη. [Civil War Passions (co-authored with Nikos Marantzidis). Athens: Metechmio, 2015]

και θρίαμβοι. Οι 7 κύκλοι της σύγχρονης ελληνικής ιστορίας [Disasters and Triumphs: The 7 cycles of Modern Greek History/ Athens: Papadopoulos, 2015]

Ανατομία της κρίσης [Anatomy of the Crisis (co-authored with Thanos Veremis, George Pagoulatos, Theodoros Couloumbis, Loukas Tsoukalis, and Haridimos Tsoukas). Athens: Skai, 2011]

Ανορθόδοξοι Πόλεμοι: Μακεδονία, Εμφύλιος, Κύπρος [Irregular Wars: Macedonia, Civil War, Cyprus (co-edited with Vassilis K. Gounaris and Ioannis Stefanidis). Athens: Patakis, 2010]

References

Sources
https://www.asc.ox.ac.uk/person/3400
https://stathiskalyvas.files.wordpress.com/2008/09/cv_kalyvas.pdf
Stathis Kalyvas, University of Oxford, Department of Politics and International Relations

Greek political scientists
Historians of modern Greece
Yale University faculty
Academics of the University of Oxford
University of Chicago Booth School of Business faculty
Living people
1964 births